Eupithecia rotundopuncta is a moth in the family Geometridae first described by Alpheus Spring Packard in 1871. It is found in western North America from Arizona to the Pacific coast, north to Vancouver Island in British Columbia.

The wingspan is about 17–20 mm. There is considerable banding of light russet brown in the antemedian, subterminal, and terminal areas of the forewings.

References

Moths described in 1871
rotundopuncta
Moths of North America